The Kramatorsk radiological accident was a radiation accident that happened in Kramatorsk, in the Ukrainian SSR from 1980 to 1989. A small capsule containing highly radioactive caesium-137 was found inside the concrete wall of an apartment building, with a surface gamma radiation exposure dose rate of 1800 R/year. The capsule was detected only after residents requested that the level of radiation in the apartment be measured by a health physicist.

The capsule was originally part of a radiation level gauge and was lost in the Karansky quarry in the late 1970s. The search for the capsule was unsuccessful and ended after a week. The gravel from the quarry was used in construction. The caesium capsule ended up in the concrete panel of apartment 85 of building 7 on Mariyi Pryimachenko Street (at the time under the Soviet name Gvardeytsiv Kantemirovtsiv), between apartments 85 and 52.

Over nine years, two families lived in apartment 85. A child's bed was located directly next to the wall containing the capsule. The apartment was fully settled in 1980. A year later, an 18-year-old woman who lived there suddenly died. In 1982, her 16-year-old brother followed, and then their mother. Even after that the flat did not attract much public attention, despite the fact that the residents all died from leukemia. Doctors were unable to determine root-cause of illness and explained the diagnosis by poor heredity. A new family moved into the apartment, and their son died from leukemia as well. His father managed to start a detailed investigation, during which the vial was found in the wall in 1989.

By the time the capsule was discovered, four residents of the building had died from it and 17 more had received varying doses of radiation. Part of the wall was removed and sent to the Institute for Nuclear Research, where the caesium capsule was removed, identified by serial number and disposed of.

See also 
 List of civilian radiation accidents

References 

1980s disasters in the Soviet Union
1980s disasters in Ukraine
1989 in Ukraine
1989 industrial disasters
Environmental disasters in Ukraine
Kramatorsk
Radiation accidents and incidents
Radioactively contaminated areas
Caesium